As a country, Somalia has a very poor health care system. following demographic statistics relate to the state of general health in Somalia are from the CIA World Factbook:

Population: 12.3 million (2014 est.)

Age structure
0–14 years: 45.6% (male 2,881,283/female 2,740,209)
15–64 years: 52.5% (male 3,219,425/female 3,226,432)
65 years and over: 2% (male 144,056/female 105,407) (2014 est.)

Population growth rate: 3.8% (2014 est.)

Birth rate: 40.87 births/1,000 population (2014 est.)

Death rate: 13.91 deaths/1,000 population (2014 est.)

Sex ratio
at birth: 0.894 male(s)/female 
under 15 years: 1 male(s)/female 
15–64 years: 1.07 male(s)/female 
65 years and over: 0.66 male(s)/female 
total population: 1.028 male(s)/female (2014 est.)

Infant mortality rate
100.4 deaths/1,000 live births (2012 est.) 
male: 108.89 deaths/1,000 live births 
female: 92.12 deaths/1,000 live births (2014 est.)

Life expectancy at birth

total population: 51.8 years 
male: 49.58 years 
female: 53.65 years (2014 est.)

Total fertility rate
6.08 children born/woman (2014 est.)

HIV/AIDS
HIV/AIDS - adult prevalence rate:
0.5% (2009 est.)
HIV/AIDS - people living with HIV/AIDS:
31,200 (2009 est.)
HIV/AIDS - deaths:
2,500 (2009 est.)

Major infectious diseases
degree of risk: high 
food or waterborne diseases: bacterial and protozoal diarrhea, hepatitis A and E, and typhoid fever 
vectorborne diseases: dengue fever, malaria, and Rift Valley fever 
water contact disease: schistosomiasis 
animal contact disease: rabies (2009)

References